The Perpetual Accord ( in German 'Ewige Richtung') was a peace treaty and alliance of the 8 Cantons of the Old Swiss Confederacy and Arch Duke Sigismund of Austria. King Louis XI of France was elected as a mediator between both parties. Negotiations first took place in 1472  in Constance. 
As with many early matters of the Old Swiss Confederacy, the treaty was not signed with all 8 cantons and the other party at once, but in stages. In 1474 Sigismund signed it with CH, in 1478 with the Forest Cantons (Uri, Schwyz and Unterwalden)

The first version was finalized on 30 March 1474, but had to wait until early 1475 for the ratification of the final version.

References

Peace treaties
Treaties of the Old Swiss Confederacy
1470s treaties
Treaties of the Holy Roman Empire